Armando Aráuz Aguilar (26 January 1922 – 11 May 2002) was a Costa Rican lawyer and politician who served as Second Vice President of Costa Rica between 1982 and 1986, serving under president Luis Alberto Monge. He was also a Deputy in the Legislative Assembly of Costa Rica between 1966 and 1970 and again between 1979 and 1982. He was a law professor at the University of Costa Rica. He died of a heart attack.

References

1922 births
2002 deaths
Costa Rican politicians
University of Costa Rica alumni